Talis quercella is a species of moth in the family Crambidae. The species was first described by Michael Denis and Ignaz Schiffermüller in 1775. It is found in Italy, Austria, the Czech Republic, Slovakia, Poland, Hungary, Romania, Bulgaria, Croatia, Ukraine, Russia, Asia Minor, Iraq, Iran, China, Mongolia and North Africa.

Subspecies
Talis quercella quercella (Europe, Russia, Asia Minor, Iraq)
Talis quercella pallidella Caradja, 1916 (Kuldja, Tien-Shan, Mongolia)
Talis quercella suaedella Chrétien, 1910 (Tunisia, Algeria)
Talis quercella iranica Amsel, 1949 (Iran)

References

Moths described in 1775
Ancylolomiini
Moths of Europe
Moths of Africa
Moths of Asia